The High Commission of Cyprus is the diplomatic mission of Cyprus in the United Kingdom. It is located at 13 St James's Square, next door to the London Library and very close to Chatham House.

In 2012 there was a small protest outside the High Commission by people claiming to have been mis-sold property on the island.

Gallery

See also 
 Cyprus–United Kingdom relations

References

External links
Official site

Cyprus
Diplomatic missions of Cyprus
Cyprus–United Kingdom relations
Buildings and structures in the City of Westminster
St James's